Colin Ernest Sutherland Gordon (24 December 1907 – 22 August 1960) was a high jumper from British Guiana (present-day Guyana). He competed for Great Britain at the 1928 Summer Olympics and finished in 17th place. At the 1930 British Empire Games he represented British Guiana and won the silver medal. Gordon was the son of John Richard Colin Gordon, a sugar-planter, and his wife Hilda Sloman.

Gordon worked as a teacher at Trinity College School, Port Hope, Ontario, Canada for a year and in 1931 moved to Geelong Grammar School in Australia. During World War II he served as a Wing Commander with the Royal Australian Air Force. After demobilisation he became Headmaster of St. Peter's College in Adelaide, Australia, where he worked until his death in 1960.

References
 

1907 births
1960 deaths
Guyanese high jumpers
British male high jumpers
Olympic athletes of Great Britain
Athletes (track and field) at the 1928 Summer Olympics
Athletes (track and field) at the 1930 British Empire Games
Commonwealth Games silver medallists for British Guiana
Commonwealth Games medallists in athletics
Royal Australian Air Force personnel of World War II
People from Mahaica-Berbice
Guyanese male athletes
Guyanese people of British descent
Alumni of the University of Oxford
Medallists at the 1930 British Empire Games